Gadia may refer to:

 Gadia Lohar, a social group of India
 Gadia, Barabanki, a village in Uttar Pradesh, India
 Daniel Gadia (born 1995), Filipino footballer
 Dominic Gadia (born 1986), Guamanian footballer
 Gadia (month), the twelfth month of the Mandaean calendar

See also 
 Ghadia (disambiguation)